Geronimo "Gerry" J. Peñalosa (born August 7, 1972) is a Filipino former professional boxer who competed from 1989 to 2010. He is a two-weight world champion, having held the WBC super-flyweight title from 1997 to 1998, and the WBO bantamweight title from 2007 to 2009. Originally from the city of San Carlos, Negros Occidental, Peñalosa currently resides in Manila. He was trained mainly by Freddie Roach, and went on to become a boxing trainer himself after retirement. Peñalosa's older brother, Dodie Boy Peñalosa, is also a former boxer and world champion.

Professional career

Early years at flyweight
Peñalosa turned professional in 1989. He made his debut against Fidel Jubay on May 20, 1989, and won the bout by knockout.

Super flyweight
He captured the WBC and lineal super flyweight title with a decision win over Hiroshi Kawashima on 27 February 1997 and has defended the title three times since then.

He later lost it on points to In-Joo Cho on 29 August 1998. Two years later, he had a rematch with Cho to regain the title but again lost by controversial unanimous decision.

Retirement and comeback
On 24 September 2001, he challenged Masamori Tokuyama who then succeeded Cho in being the WBC super flyweight champion. However, he lost by another controversial split decision. The two fought again on 20 December 2002 but the result was the same, in Tokuyama's favor. Peñalosa temporarily retired that year.

Peñalosa returned to boxing two years later. He defeated Bangsaen Sithpraprom for the World Boxing Foundation (WBFo) super flyweight title on 7 November 2004.

Super bantamweight
On 17 March 2007, he took on Daniel Ponce de León who then held the WBO super bantamweight title. In the fight, Peñalosa displayed his intelligence, excellent boxing skills and defensive abilities. De León who is a knockout artist could not land a clear punch on Peñalosa.  Peñalosa answered with stinging counters that frustrated De Leon. Although De Leon was the busier boxer, most of his punches landed in the air and on Peñalosa's gloves. However, De Leon won via unanimous decision.

Return to bantamweight

WBO champion
On August 11, 2007, the veteran Filipino boxer took on Jhonny González of Mexico for the WBO bantamweight title at the Arco Arena in Sacramento, California, California. Peñalosa went down in weight and dethroned the Mexican fighter at the 7th round.

The younger fighter appeared to be in control of the match in the early rounds, as he skillfully kept the much shorter Peñalosa away with crisp jabs. Peñalosa stayed patient and continued to walk forward even though he is getting hit by some of the Mexican's punches. In the seventh round, Peñalosa got an opportunity, when Gonzales launched a strong right that missed Peñalosa head. Gonzalez failed to pull his arm back quickly and at that short moment, leaving a hole for the veteran fighter, who then threw a precise and solid left hook to Gonzalez’ body. The defending champion fell on the canvas a few moments after receiving the counter-attack; the Mexican tried to get up and fight again but failed to do it remained down on the canvas. This was Peñalosa's second world title in 10 years.

He defended the title in Quezon City, Philippines by stopping former world title holder Ratanachai Sor Vorapin of Thailand in the eighth round on 6 April 2008.

This was the second time he fought Sor Vorapin in which Peñalosa prevailed on both encounters.

On February 21, 2009, Peñalosa took on German Meraz of Mexico at the Cebu Coliseum in Cebu City, Cebu, Philippines; the two fought in the main event of the "Battle of the Bantamweights" card. The WBO title was not at stake. The Filipino boxer won the fight by unanimous decision after 10 rounds.

Events outside the ring
After the Manny Pacquiao-Marco Antonio Barrera rematch in Las Vegas, Peñalosa and Jorge Arce of Mexico nearly figured in a fistfight, according to a report by Philboxing.com. The two boxers crossed  their way out of the Mandalay Bay Events Center. The boxing website said its sources revealed that it was Arce who challenged Peñalosa to a fight. Peñalosa was reportedly with his wife Goody and Japanese associate Kosuke Washio when the incident happened. Arce was reportedly irritated when one spectator told him upon seeing Peñalosa that the Filipino boxer is more popular than him. The proud Mexican, the report said, apparently did not like the comments and immediately confronted the Filipino world champion. According to the report, Peñalosa was apparently irked by Arce's actuations and tried to follow the Mexican boxer but was prevailed upon by Goody.

Super bantamweight
He later fought on 25 April 2009, in Puerto Rico against Puerto Rican sensation Juan Manuel López for the WBO Super Bantamweight Championship. The showdown featured as a Champion versus Champion match because the two fighters were both holders of WBO World titles. Peñalosa had the bantamweight title and Lopez had the super bantamweight belt.

Early in the fight, both pugilists exchanged combinations, with López gaining a slight advantage by targeting the head and body of Peñalosa. This pattern continued in the third and fourth rounds, while the challenger continued counterattacking despite receiving more damage. Between the fifth and sixth chapters, both pugilists exchanged combinations, with Peñalosa scoring his most solid punches. During the following two rounds, López managed to establish control of the offensive's tempo, but Peñalosa continued using his counterattack. Prior to the ninth chapter, Peñalosa's trainer, Freddie Roach, warned him that he had to win by knockout or the fight would be stopped. In the round, the pattern continued with few variations, once it was over Roach submitted the fight. With this technical knockout, López became the first boxer to defeat the veteran by knockout.

After the fight, the Filipino boxer said: "He (Lopez) was too big for me. I felt his punches. But I hope he wasn't lying after the fight when he said he felt my punches, too. I was the underdog but I gave it my best. I trained hard for that fight". Then Peñalosa talked about a possible retirement after one last fight, as he wants to hang up his gloves as a champion. Many people, including members of his family and his friend, Manny Pacquiao, wanted Peñalosa to quit boxing already, saying he has nothing more to prove in the sport.

In April, Peñalosa was stripped of his bantamweight title before challenging WBO junior featherweight champion  Juan Manuel López.

Farewell fights
However, Peñalosa decided to fight for one more time. Many tough boxers were considered to be his possible next opponent, including Jorge Arce, Daniel Ponce de Leon, Eric Morel and Vic Darchinyan.

On 13 February 2010, Peñalosa faced Eric Morel (41-2) of Puerto Rico for the interim WBO bantamweight title at the Las Vegas Hilton in Las Vegas, Nevada. The veteran fighter trained at the Wild Card Gym in Los Angeles under the guidance of coach Freddie Roach, along with Filipino prospect Bernabe Concepcion and seven-division world champion Manny Pacquiao. The bout was part of the card named "Pinoy Power 3", in which four other Filipino boxers fought. Peñalosa eventually lost the bout by a controversial Split Decision.

At the opening round the Puerto Rican looked to stick and move while Peñalosa took on the role of the aggressor. In the early rounds Morel appeared a bit more active. Peñalosa received a bad low blow in the 2nd round and was given some time to recover. In the 6th round a clash of heads opened a cut over the Filipino's right eyes; a few moments later, another headbutt opened a severe laceration over Peñalosa's left eye. The injury bled profusely during the next rounds, but he was able to hurt the opponent with strong body punches and seemed to take control of the fight. With the bleeding clearly bothering him, the "Fearless" boxer continued to attack as Morel seemed to keep away from him. Peñalosa continued along this way through the championship rounds, while Morel looked to jab and retreat. During the last rounds, Peñalosa fought hard but apparently hadn't done enough to impress the judges. Two judges scored the fight 115-113 and 116-112 for Morel, while the third and final card scored the bout 113-115 for Peñalosa. FightFan.com had the bout scored 115-113 for Peñalosa. Some people even said that the Filipino boxer should have won over the Puerto Rican, including his trainer, Freddie Roach, and Manny Pacquiao.

Following the fight against Morel, Peñalosa stated that he will fight for one last time against Yodsaenkeng Kietmangmee of Thailand on October 10, 2010. The Filipino pugilist also revealed that the proceeds of this match will be given to Z Gorres to help him with his medical expenses. The event, called "Golpe Golpe na Zamboanga: The Last Hurrah", was held at the Zamboanga City Coliseum. The former world champion won the bout by TKO in the 4th round.

Peñalosa finished his 21-year career with a professional record of 55 wins, with 37 knockouts, 8 losses and 2 draws.

Retirement
After retiring as a fighter he became a boxing promoter with his nephew, Dave Peñalosa, among the boxers in his stable.

Outside the ring
On April 21, 2008, Peñalosa won in the game show Wheel of Fortune held in the Philippines, defeating fellow boxers Rey Bautista and Alex John Banal. The prize he earned was worth P159,000 ($3,791).

Peñalosa served as the trainer of IBF flyweight champion Nonito Donaire in 2008.

Professional boxing record

See also
List of super flyweight boxing champions
List of bantamweight boxing champions
List of WBA world champions
List of WBC world champions
List of Filipino boxing world champions

References

External links

Gerry Peñalosa profile at Cyber Boxing Zone

1972 births
Bantamweight boxers
Super-flyweight boxers
Light-flyweight boxers
Southpaw boxers
Living people
People from San Carlos, Negros Occidental
Boxers from Negros Occidental
World boxing champions
World Boxing Council champions
World super-flyweight boxing champions
World Boxing Organization champions
World bantamweight boxing champions
Filipino male boxers
Boxing trainers
Super-bantamweight boxers